Blake is a given name and surname of English origin.

Blake most commonly refers to:
 William Blake (1757–1827), English poet, painter, and printmaker

Blake or Blake's may also refer to:

Places
 Blake, Kentucky, USA
 Blake Basin, a deep area of the Atlantic Ocean
 Blake Island, Washington, USA, in Puget Sound 
 Blake River Megacaldera Complex, a large cluster of volcanoes in Ontario and Quebec, Canada
 Blake Village, Virginia, USA
 Blake's Pools, a nature reserve in south west England, UK

Art, entertainment, and media

Fictional characters
 Blake Belladonna, a character of the web series RWBY
 Anita Blake, a character, protagonist of the Anita Blake: Vampire Hunter series of books by Laurell K. Hamilton
 Bellamy Blake, fictional character in The 100 TV series
 Bob Blake, a character in a series African American westerns from the 1930s played by Herb Jeffries
 Daphne Blake, fictional character from Scooby-Doo
 Henry Blake, a character from M*A*S*H franchise
 Captain J.F. Blake, the main protagonist in the 2002 video game sequel to  The Thing
 Katherine Blake (character), killer on the soap opera Shortland Street
 Nicholas Blake (Spooks), a character in the TV series Spooks
 Octavia Blake, a character in The 100 TV series
 Peter Blake (Days of Our Lives), a character in the American soap opera Days of Our Lives
 Robert Harrison Blake, a character created by H. P. Lovecraft
 Roj Blake, a character from the television serial Blake's 7
 Sexton Blake, a fictional detective for multiple authors
 William Blake, a character in the film Dead Man
 Blake Bradley, a Navy Thunder Ranger from the TV series Power Rangers Ninja Storm
 Blake Carrington, an oil tycoon from the TV series Dynasty
 Blake Oakfield, a surf gangster from the TV series Angry Boys
 Lucien Blake, lead character in The Doctor Blake Mysteries
 Lance Corporal Thomas "Tom" Blake, main character in the 2019 war film 1917
 Earl Talbot Blake, a character played by John Lithgow in the 1991 movie  Ricochet (film)

Music
 Blake (band), a classical crossover all-male singing trio
 Blake Babies, alternative rock band

Other art, entertainment, and media
 Blake (film), a documentary film by Bill Mason
 Blake (monologue), by Elliot Hayes
Andy Blake, series of books by Edward Edson Lee
 Blake's 7, a British science fiction television series

Brands and enterprises
 Blake, Cassels & Graydon, Canadian law firm
Blake rifle
 Blake's Lotaburger, fast food chain in New Mexico, USA
 The Blake School (disambiguation), a set of schools

Other uses
 BLAKE (hash function), a cryptographic hash function
 Blake baronets, three baronetcies in Ireland, Great Britain and the UK
 Blake's hitch, a friction hitch used in tree climbing
 James Blake House, oldest house in Boston, USA

See also